The Man Who Never Was is a 1953 book by Ewen Montagu about the World War II Operation Mincemeat. Montagu  played a leading role in the 1943 scheme to deceive the Germans about the planned Allied invasion of Sicily.  The scheme entailed releasing a dead body just off the coast of Spain, where strong currents caused it to drift ashore in an area where a skilled German secret agent was known to operate. The corpse was to appear to be the victim of an airplane crash, the non-existent Royal Marine Captain (Acting Major) William Martin, who had letters in a briefcase that hinted at a forthcoming Allied invasion of Greece and Sardinia, rather than the obvious target of Sicily.

Montagu's work formed the basis for a 1956 film by the same title.

Background
In 1950 Duff Cooper, a former cabinet minister who had been briefed on the operation in March 1943, published the spy novel Operation Heartbreak, which contained the plot device of a corpse – with papers naming him as William Maryngton – being floated off the coast of Spain with false documents to deceive the Germans. The British security services decided that the best response was to publish the story of Mincemeat. Over the course of a weekend Montagu wrote The Man Who Never Was (1953), which sold two million copies and formed the basis for a 1956 film. The security services did not give Montagu complete freedom to reveal operational details, and he was careful not to mention the role played by signals intelligence to confirm that the operation had been successful. He was also careful to obscure "the idea of an organised programme of strategic deception ... with Mincemeat being presented as a 'wild' one-off caper". In 1977 Montagu published Beyond Top Secret U, his wartime autobiography, which gave further details of Mincemeat, among other operations.

References

Offsite links

Sources

  
 
  
 
 

1953 non-fiction books
Operation Mincemeat
World War II espionage
History books about World War II
Non-fiction books adapted into films